Zaruhi Babayan (born 27 December 1975) is an Armenian singer. In 2014, Babayan was awarded with the title of Honored Artist of Armenia upon the decree of Armenian president Serzh Sargsyan. She was a member of Armenia jury in Junior Eurovision Song Contest 2014 and 2017.

Discography
Janaparh Depi (2001)
Old & New (2006)
Sirelis (2016)

References

1975 births
Living people
Musicians from Yerevan
21st-century Armenian women singers
Armenian pop singers
Armenian folk-pop singers
Honored artists of Armenia